The 1994 California State Treasurer election occurred on November 8, 1994. The primary elections took place on March 8, 1994. The Republican nominee, Board of Equalization Chairman Matt Fong, narrowly defeated the Democratic nominee, Phil Angelides, for the office previously held by incumbent Kathleen Brown, who chose not to seek re-election in favor of running for governor.

Primary results
Final results from California Secretary of State.

Democratic

Others

General election results
Final results from the Secretary of State of California.

Results by county
Final results from the Secretary of State of California.

See also
California state elections, 1994
State of California
California State Treasurer

References

1994 California elections
California state treasurer elections
California